Zeynep Karahan Uslu is a Turkish communication scientist, public relations specialist and politician.

Academic career

After graduation in Journalism and Public Relations, Uslu obtained master’s degree (M.A.) and PhD from the Department of Public Relations and Publicity of the Institute of Social Sciences in 1992 and 1998. 

She worked as a faculty member at Istanbul University in the School of Communications (1991-94) and the Sociology Department of the School of Letters (1994-2002). After serving as Deputy at the Turkish Parliament during the 22nd legislative session, she resumed her scientific work, becoming not only the Founder and President of the Centre for Studies on Turkey (TAM) of Istanbul Aydin University, but also working as a faculty member at the School of Communications of the same university (2007-2009). In 2010, she was appointed as an associate professor of Applied Communications. Between 2009 and 2011, she was Adviser to the Chancellor of the TOBB Economy and Technology University and served as faculty member and Chair of the Department of Visual Communication Design and at the School of Fine Arts. After serving once again as Deputy at the Turkish Parliament during the 24th legislative session, she returned to academic life. She founded the Chair of Public Relations and Advertising at Çankaya University of Ankara, where she currently holds the positions of Head of the Department with the academic title of “professor” and Advisor to the Chairman of the Board of Trustees.

Zeynep Karahan Uslu has authored, collaborated in and edited ten books on political communication, sociology of communication, public diplomacy, inter-ethnic communication, women’s studies and cultural heritage. Within the framework of her personal interest in culture, art and history, she continues to produce social benefits in these fields in both her academic and political life through her activities in NGOs and her endeavours on national and international scale. (1) Throughout her career as a faculty member, she has also worked as campaign and communications consultant for several political parties.

Politics
In 2002, she was elected as Deputy of Istanbul, gaining the title as "the youngest female parliamentarian" of the 22nd legislative session. In the same period, she was elected as the first Chairperson of Turkish Group at the Euro Mediterranean Parliamentary Assembly (EMPA). In the meanwhile, she was also the Spokeswoman of the Environment Committee, the Deputy Chairperson of the Turkey-Pakistan Inter-Parliamentary Friendship Group, Member of the European Parliamentary Forum on Population and Development and the Co-Chair of the Turkey-Italy Inter-Parliamentary Cooperation Protocol in the course of the 22nd legislative session of the Turkish Parliament.

She was re-elected to the Parliament during the 24th legislative session as Deputy of Şanlıurfa, being the third female parliamentarian throughout the city’s history. She was elected as the Head of the Turkish Delegation to the Parliamentary Assembly of the Union for the Mediterranean (PA UfM). During the same period, she has contributed to the activities of the Committee on Equal Opportunity for Women and Men of the Turkish Parliament as a member and has chaired the Subcommittee on Gender Equality in the Media, while serving also as Co-Chair of Turkey-Italy Inter-Parliamentary Cooperation Protocol.

During her political career, she focused on human rights and freedoms and worked in the fields of women's issues, environmental policies, children's rights and social inequalities, and supported the campaigns and activities of NGOs and various organizations within this context (2). She has prepared reports and legislative proposals focusing on these issues at the Turkish Grand National Assembly, represented her country many times on international platforms (3), and contributed to the development of Turkey's accession process to the European Union through her political roles and tasks. After her term as a deputy, Karahan continued to work in some non-governmental organizations in the aforementioned areas. (4)

Between 2003-2012, she served as the Deputy Chairperson responsible for Public Relations of the AK Party (Justice and Development Party) and she was the person who lead the process of establishment and development of AKİM (AK Party Communication Centre), which contributed to the interactive and a more widespread communication with the citizens. As a successful project AKİM (5) was awarded the “Golden Compass” by TÜHİD (Public Relations Association of Turkey) and the AK Party became the first political party to receive an award in the field of communication.

Karahan Uslu has been elected as a Member of the Consultative Committee of the Foreign Relations Department of AK Party, as well as being elected as a Member of the Central Decision and Executive Board (MKYK) during the 3rd and 4th General Congress of AK Party. Between 2012-2016, she served as the Deputy Chairperson of R&D Department (6) and was nominated as the candidate of AK Party for Deputy of Aydin during the parliamentary elections of 7 June 2015. Between 2016 and 2017, she actively took part in the party’s administration serving as Advisor to the Chairperson of the AK Party. After 2017 she has left politics and concentrated on her academic works, not applied for candidacy in neither of the subsequent elections.

Roles within national and international bodies
• Chairperson of the Board of Trustees of the Yıldız Palace Foundation (2013 - …)
• Chairperson of the Expert Committee on Gender Equality of the Turkish National Commission for UNESCO (2018 – …)
• Board Member of the Turkish National Commission for UNESCO (2018 – …)
• Member of the Consultative Board of the Kenan Yavuz Ethnography Museum (2020 – ...)
• Member of the Global Distance Education Dissemination and Alternative Education Research Association (2019 – …)
• Deputy Chair of the Equal Opportunity Commission of the Standing Committee for the Euro Mediterranean Partnership of Local and Regional Authorities (COPPEM) (2009 – 2016)
• Member of the UniCredit International Advisory Board (2007-2009)
• Member of the Italian Academy of Cuisine (Accademia Italiana Della Cucina) (2005 – 2010)
• Member of the international network Parliamentarians for Global Action – PGA) (2011 – …)
• Member of the High Consultative Commission of the Turkish Parliamentarian Union (TPB) (2011 – 2016)
• Founding Member of the Turkish Language and Literature Association (2008 – …)
• Member of the Parliamentary Network on the World Bank (2005 – 2007)
• Member of the Touring and Automobile Club of Turkey (2007 - …)
• Founding Board Member of the Eurasia Sociologists’ Association (2007-…)
• Founding Board Member of the Alumni Association of the School of Communication of İstanbul University (2007 - ...)
• Member of the Nonviolent Radical Party (2005 – …)
• Member of the Board of Trustees of Istanbul Aydın University (2003-2006)
• Member of the Anatolian Club (2002 - ...)
• Member of the International Communication Association (ICA) (2001 – …)
• Member of the Sociological Association (2000 – …)
• Founding Member of the Hazar Education, Culture and Solidarity Association (1993 – ...)
• Member of the Culture and Solidarity Association of Şanlıurfa (1990 – …)

Personal life

Uslu is the daughter of Prof. Dr. Abdulkadir Karahan, who is known for his studies on Turkology and theology, and Süreyya Karahan, who was a mathematics teacher.

Publications
• Göbeklitepe: History of Humankind Rewritten. Zeynep Karahan Uslu, Yıldız Sarayı Vakfı Yayınları, Istanbul, 2019. (Turkish-English, Italian-English)
• Broken grounds 2: Intercultural communication, multiculturalism. Zeynep Karahan Uslu and Can Bilgili, Beta Yayınları, Istanbul, 2012 (English and Turkish)
• Bilinç Endüstrisinin İktidar ve Siyaset Pratikleri, Zeynep Karahan Uslu, Can Bilgili, Beta Yayınları, Istanbul, 2009
• Televizyon ve Kadın, Zeynep Karahan Uslu, Alfa Yayınları, Istanbul, 2000

Awards
• “Successful Women” Award, Federation of Public Employees Associations, 2015
• “Deputy of the Year” Award, “Vision 2023 in Politics and Economy” Magazine, 2013
• “Deputy of the Year” Award, Turkish Youth Council, 2013
• “Businesswoman Active in Civil Society, Business World, Politics” Award, ANGİAD (Young Entrepreneurs Association of Ankara), 2012
• Order of the Star of Italian Solidarity, 2007 (7)
• “Deputy of the Year” Award, Federation of Public Employees Associations, 2007
• “May 19th” Youth Award, Habitat and Local Agenda 21 Youth Association, 2004
• “Deputy of the Year” Award, Politics (“Siyaset”) Magazine, 2004

External links
 www.zkuslu.com

1969 births
Academic staff of Istanbul University
Academic staff of Çankaya University
Recipients of the Order of Merit of the Italian Republic
Living people
21st-century Turkish politicians